Rollerball may refer to:
 Rollerball pen, a type of ballpoint pen and ink
 Roller ball (pointing device), a trackball-device invented by Ralph Benjamin
 Rollerball (1975 film), a science fiction film based on the short story "Rollerball Murder"
 Rollerball (2002 film), a remake of the 1975 film
 Rollerball (video game), a 1988 pinball-themed video game for the NES
 Rollerball (band), Australian band
 Rollerball (chess variant), a chess variant by Jean-Louis Cazaux, inspired by the film
 "Rollerball", a song by Scottish band Mogwai from the 1998 EP No Education = No Future (Fuck the Curfew)
 Rollerball, a brand of inline skates that have ball-shaped wheels.
 Mark "Rollerball" Rocco, English retired professional wrestler

See also 
 Roller derby